"She! Her! Her!" is a single by Japanese boy band Kis-My-Ft2. It was released on March 21, 2012. It debuted in number one on the weekly Oricon Singles Chart and reached number one on the Billboard Japan Hot 100. It was the 16th best-selling single in Japan in 2012, with 355,374 copies.

References 

2012 singles
2012 songs
Japanese-language songs
Kis-My-Ft2 songs
Oricon Weekly number-one singles
Billboard Japan Hot 100 number-one singles